Roland Joseph "Rollie" McLenahan (October 26, 1921 – April 23, 1984) was a Canadian professional ice hockey player and coach. He played 8 games in the National Hockey League for the Detroit Red Wings during the 1945–46 season. The rest of his career, which lasted from 1941 to 1957, was spent in the minor leagues.

McLenahan was a member of the AHL First All Star Team in 1950, and a member of the IHL First All-Star Team in 1954, 1955, and 1956. He retired from playing hockey following the 1956–1957 season.

Post-retirement
From 1957 to 1958, he was head coach of the AHL's Rochester Americans, who won the Calder Cup that year. He later served as a Director for the Department of Youth for the Province of New Brunswick from 1961 to 1981. He was a scout for Montreal from 1960 to 1968, and a member of the Canada Games Council. McLenahan also served as director of the CAHA, and a director of Hockey Canada. He helped found the New Brunswick Sports Hall of Fame, and the New Brunswick Amateur Hockey Association.

In 1981, he was discovered to have lung cancer, but the cancer spread to his brain. He died in his native Fredericton, at the age of 62, on April 23, 1984, and was buried in the Fredericton Hermitage Cemetery. He was inducted into the New Brunswick Sports Hall of Fame in 1982 and in 2005, Krista Betts, a gold medal winner in Canadian Women's Wrestling at the Canada Games who is from the small farming community of Bass River, Weldford Parish, New Brunswick received the prestigious Roly McLenahan Award.

Career statistics

Regular season and playoffs

References

External links
 
 New Brunswick Sports Hall of Fame

1921 births
1984 deaths
Buffalo Bisons (AHL) players
Canadian expatriates in the United States
Canadian ice hockey coaches
Canadian ice hockey defencemen
Canadian ice hockey players
Cincinnati Mohawks (IHL) players
Cleveland Barons (1937–1973) players
Detroit Red Wings players
Eastern Hockey League coaches
Guelph Biltmore Mad Hatters players
Hershey Bears players
Ice hockey people from New Brunswick
Indianapolis Capitals players
New Brunswick Sports Hall of Fame inductees
Southern Hockey League (1973–1977) coaches
Sportspeople from Fredericton
Washington Eagles players